The United Airlines Rock 'n' Roll Washington DC Marathon & 1/2 Marathon, formerly known as the National Marathon, is an annual marathon and half marathon held in Washington, D.C. since 2006.  The races take place entirely within Washington, D.C., and finish near RFK Stadium.

The race is organized by Advance Publications' Ironman Group.

History 

The marathon was started by the Greater Washington Sports Alliance in 2006.

In 2007, the National Marathon was sponsored by Wirefly, an online cell phone retailer.

In 2008, SunTrust Banks became the race's primary sponsor.  The number of participants was limited to 8,000 in 2008.

The race was sold to Competitor Group, Inc. in 2011 to become part of their Rock 'n' Roll Marathon Series.

The 2020 edition of the race was cancelled due to the coronavirus pandemic.

Course 

Both the marathon course and the half marathon course start on Constitution Avenue near the National Mall and finish near RFK Stadium.  In addition, both courses are entirely contained within Washington, D.C.

The course for the inaugural race in 2006 was largely in Washington, D.C., with about  located in Prince George's County, Maryland.

In 2007, the course was altered so that it was located entirely within the District of Columbia.  The race in 2008 and thereafter passes through 6 of the District's 8 wards.

In 2012, the start was moved westward from a location near the RFK Stadium and the finish to a location near the National Mall on Constitution Avenue, beginning with the 2013 race.

Community impact 

Among the beneficiaries of the marathon are Boys & Girls Clubs of Greater Washington, Special Olympics District of Columbia, United For D.C., Fort Dupont Ice Arena, Washington Tennis & Education Foundation and Black History Invitational Swim Meet.

Winners

Notes

References

External links

Marathons in the United States
Running in Washington, D.C.